Galinthias is an African genus of praying mantises (order Mantodea); it is the type genus for the new family Galinthiadidae.

Species
Galinthias amoena
Galinthias meruensis
Galinthias occidentalis
Galinthias philbyi 
Galinthias rhomboidalis

See also
List of mantis genera and species

References

Galinthiadidae
Mantodea genera
Taxa named by Carl Stål